Philloki ( Urdu : پِھلوکی)is a village located near a town Qila Didar Singh Tehsil Nowshera Virkan, District Gujranwala, Punjab.

Geography
Philloki is located near town Qila Didar Singh, in District Gujranwala, Punjab, Pakistan. It's in the west of Qila Didar Singh and Gujranwala.

Education 
Education System is very good. There are many public and private school in village.

 Government High School For Boys
 Government High School For Girls

See also
Badoki Saikhwan
Qila Didar Singh
Hamboki
Chabba Sindhwan
Gujranwala

References

Villages in Pakistan
Punjab
Gujranwala District